The Little Native Hockey League, also known as the Little NHL, is an annual hockey tournament held for First Nation youth throughout Ontario.

History 
The Little Native Hockey League was founded by Earl Abotossaway, former Chief Jim McGregor, the late James D. Debassiage, the late Reverend Leonard Self and the late Norman Debassiage in 1971. The tournament was established based on four pillars: education, citizenship, sportsmanship and respect. The very first tournament took place during Christmas break of 1971, with 17 teams and 200 players on Manitoulin Island in the town of Little Current. Most recently, the 2018 tournament was held during the March break in Mississauga, Ontario, with 209 teams and about 3000 players from across the province. The current president is Marian Jacko, a member of the Wilkwemkoong Unceded Territory.

The tournament has become a major draw, increasing in size every year such that the host city needs to ensure it has the resources to accommodate the week-long event. Recently, Sudbury put in a bid to host the 46th tournament, but Mississauga was awarded it instead. Ontario Regional Chief Isadore Day elaborated that Mississauga is really the only place with the size needed to hold the Little NHL because the tournament draws such a larger number of teams from around the province. Smaller cities formerly did host this event, such as Sudbury and Sault Ste. Marie, but they can no longer meet the demands. First Nation communities also act as hosts for the tournament; the City of Mississauga will remain the host until the 50th anniversary in 2021.

About

Team Categories 
Teams participating in the tournament are divided into categories by age, gender and level of competition.

Boys Division:

 Tyke - ages 5 & 6
 Novice - ages 7 & 8 (Competitive and Recreational)
 Atom - ages 9 & 10 (Competitive and Recreational)
 Peewee - ages 11 & 12 (Competitive and Recreational)
 Bantam - ages 13 &14 (Competitive and Recreational)
 Midget - ages 15–17 (Competitive and Recreational)

Girls Division:

 Novice - ages 7 & 8
 Atom - ages 9 & 10
 Peewee - ages 11 & 12
 Bantam - ages 13 & 14
 Midget - ages 15–17

Girls are permitted to play in the male division, but boys are not permitted to play in any female division. All ages play full ice games except for the Tyke division, which only plays half-ice game.

Eligibility 
All teams must represent an Ontario First Nation in order to enter. Every player is expected to compete for his/her First Nation community as indicated on his/her status card with the exception of those players who have used the residency option or have been released from his/her First Nation. For players to be eligible, they must have one parent of native birth, and a federal band number. Players without these qualify by presenting a legal affidavit that proves native descent.

Hall of Fame 
The Little NHL has a hall of fame to honour the alumni, builders, and friends of the tournament.

Notable alumni

Hall of Fame Alumni of the Little NHL 
The Little NHL Hall of Fame has inducted ten former players who “have advanced to play hockey at a higher calibre” and who “have been instrumental in advocating hockey development in their communities and continue to support participation in the Little NHL Tournament,” designating them “Alumni of the Little NHL.”

35th Anniversary, 2006

 Barry Hawk Tabobondung
 Gerard Peltier
 Ted Nolan

40th Anniversary, 2011

 Kathryn Corbiere  
 Dave Avery  
 Jonathan Cheechoo

45th Anniversary, 2016

 Maryanne Menefee  
 Kelly Babstock  
 Mervin Cheechoo  
 Chris Simon

Other Alumni 
Many other former participants have gone on to various levels of hockey with Junior B, Junior A/Tier II, major junior (OHL, etc.), collegiate (NCAA, U Sports, etc.), and professional (AHL, NHL NWHL, etc.).

Reggie Leach
Brandon Montour
Jordan Nolan
Jason Simon

References

External links
 

Indigenous culture in Canada
1971 establishments in Canada
Sports organizations of Canada
First Nations sportspeople
Ice hockey tournaments in Canada